Patriotic Action for Liberation (in French: Action patriotique de libération, in Wolof: Dog Buumu Gaace) is a political party in Senegal.

The general secretary of the party is Amadou Moustapha Fall Ché. The party is led by a politburo and a central committee. The headquarters of the party are based in Kaolack.

The ideology of the party is Humanist Socialism. The symbol of the party is a red rose on blue background.

The party was registered with the Senegalese authorities on October 10, 2000.

Standpoint of Caricature issue
Regarding the Danish caricatures of Muhammad, the Apl condemned them as a 'provocation of the European extreme rightwing' against Islam.

Sources

Political parties established in 2000
Political parties in Senegal